The teams competing in Group 2 of the 2011 UEFA European Under-21 Championships qualifying competition were Armenia, Estonia, Georgia, Republic of Ireland, Switzerland and Turkey.

Standings

Matches

Goalscorers
As of 4 September, there have been 75 goals scored over 28 games, for an average of 2.68 goals per game.

1 goal

Own Goals
 François Affolter (for Turkey)
 Hasan Ali Kaldırım (for Georgia)

References
UEFA.com

2011 UEFA European Under-21 Championship qualification
under
under